The Renard Epervier was a Belgian prototype single-seat all-metal fighter monoplane designed by Alfred Renard at the Societé Anonyme Avions et Moteurs Renard for a government-sponsored design contest in 1928. The Epervier Type 2 was built and flown in 1928, by Belgian aircraft manufacturer Stampe et Vertongen. It carried an armament of two synchronised 7.7mm guns and was lost in September 1928 after failing to recover from a flat spin. A second prototype, the Epervier Type 2bis, introduced revised streamlined fairings for the cantilever mainwheel legs, mainwheel spats and cylinder aft-fairings and was built by SABCA (Société Anonyme Belge de Constructions Aéronautiques).

Variants
Epervier Type 2 The prototype fighter designed, built and flown by Stampe et Vertongen in 1928, crashing in a flat spin in September 1928: one built.
Epervier Type 2bis A replacement aircraft for the first prototype, built by SABCA and powered by a  SABCA Jupiter or  Hispano-Suiza 12N engine.; one built.
Epervier Type 3 A developed version to have been powered by a  Rolls-Royce Kestrel V-12 engine; not built.

Specifications - Type 2bis

References

Bibliography

1920s Belgian fighter aircraft
Epervier
Aircraft first flown in 1928